Larry B. Wiley (born March 3, 1950) is a former Democratic member of the Utah State House of Representatives, who represented the 31st District from 2005 to 2014. Wiley and his wife Karen have five children.

Early life and education
Wiley attended the University of Utah.

Wiley worked for E-S, United States Distilled Products from 1969 to 1972. He then worked as a carpenter for Local 184 Carpenters from 1972 to 1983. He also worked for the Christiansen Brother's Construction Company as foreman from 1975 to 1983. Wiley has been an administrator for the Salt Lake City Corporation since 1983. He is currently a building inspector as well.

Political career
Wiley was elected on November 6, 2012.  During 2014, he served on the House Business and Labor Committee and the House Natural Resources, Agriculture, and Environment Committee.

2014 sponsored legislation

Representative Wiley also floor sponsored SB 58.

References

External links
Utah House of Representatives – Larry Wiley Official UT House profile
Project Vote Smart – Larry Wiley profile
2006 campaign contributions
Links to bills sponsored by Rep. Wiley in 2014

1950 births
Living people
Democratic Party members of the Utah House of Representatives
People from West Valley City, Utah
University of Utah alumni
21st-century American politicians